Samuel Raymond Hargraves (born October 27, 1976) is an American college basketball coach who is currently serving as the head coach of the Olivet Comets men's basketball team, a role he has held since 2019.

Head coaching record

References

External links
 Olivet profile

1976 births
Living people
Alma Scots men's basketball coaches
American basketball coaches
College men's basketball head coaches in the United States
Calvin Knights men's basketball players
Olivet Comets men's basketball coaches